Astrothelium ecuadorense is a species of corticolous (bark-dwelling), crustose lichen in the family Trypetheliaceae. Found in Ecuador, it was formally described as a new species in 2016 by Dutch lichenologist André Aptroot. The type specimen was collected by Harrie Sipman in the Estacion Cientifico San Francisco in the South Ecuadorian Andes (Zamora-Chinchipe Province); there, it was found in a mountainous rainforest growing on smooth tree bark. No lichen products were detected in the collected specimens. The main characteristics of the lichen distinguishing it from others in Astrothelium are the lack of pseudocyphellae on the thallus, and the solitary, exposed, black ascomata. It is also one of the few Astrothelium species with only two spores in its asci.

References

ecuadorense
Lichen species
Lichens described in 2016
Lichens of Ecuador
Taxa named by André Aptroot